Dr. Henry Genet Taylor House and Office is located in Camden, Camden County, New Jersey, United States. It was added to the National Register of Historic Places on August 12, 1971. The building was designed by Wilson Eyre and was built in 1884.

As of January 2015, renovation was underway by Rutgers University–Camden to convert the building into a Writers House for graduate students.

See also
National Register of Historic Places listings in Camden County, New Jersey

References

Houses on the National Register of Historic Places in New Jersey
Queen Anne architecture in New Jersey
Houses completed in 1884
Houses in Camden County, New Jersey
Buildings and structures in Camden, New Jersey
National Register of Historic Places in Camden County, New Jersey
New Jersey Register of Historic Places
Writers' centres and houses